Anthia ida is a species of ground beetle in the subfamily Anthiinae. It was described by Kolbe in 1894.

References

Anthiinae (beetle)
Beetles described in 1894